Allan Hogg (born November 1, 1939) is an English-born Canadian former professional darts player who competed in the 1970s and 1980s. He was nicknamed Big Al.

Career
After winning the 1978 Canadian National Championship who will beat Hillyard Rossiter, Hogg reached the final of the 1979 Winmau World Masters. He defeated Tony Brown, Tony Clark and Barry Done before losing to Eric Bristow. In 1980. He was on the Unipart World Team Darts Matchplay with Tony Holyoake and Tony Foley to Canada. He then played in the 1980 BDO World Darts Championship, losing in the first round to Australian Alan Grant. In the 1981 BDO World Darts Championship, Hogg defeated Les Capewell in the first round before losing to John Lowe in round two.

Hogg quit the BDO in 1981.

World Championship results

BDO
 1980: 1st Round (lost to Alan Grant 1–2) (sets)
 1981: 2nd Round (lost to John Lowe 1–2)

External links
Profile and stats on Darts Database

1939 births
Canadian darts players
Living people
British Darts Organisation players
People from Willowdale, Toronto
Sportspeople from North York
Sportspeople from Newcastle upon Tyne